Bllacë or Blace is a settlement in the Suva Reka municipality in Kosovo. It lies 609 m above sea level. It is exclusively inhabited by Albanians; in the 1991 census, it had 3270 inhabitants. It lies 8 km north of the Suva Reka city.

Notes

References

Villages in Suva Reka